Liga Indonesia Premier Division (Indonesian: Divisi Utama Liga Indonesia) was the regionalized second level of football competition system in Indonesia, organized by the PT Liga Prima Indonesia Sportindo and Football Association of Indonesia (PSSI). The competition is usually divided geographically into two or three groups.

Prior to the formation of Indonesia Super League in 2008, the Premier Division was the Indonesian top-flight football league. Along with Premier League/Super League, Premier Division was a competition for professional (semi professional) football clubs.

Championship history

Grouping

Broadcasting Partner 
 No Broadcasting

Best players

Top goalscorers

References

External links 
  Official website of Liga Divisi Utama Indonesia (LPIS)
  Official website of PSSI

 
2
Sports leagues established in 2011

ko:리가 인도네시아 프리미어 디비전
id:Divisi Utama Liga Indonesia